The ConocoPhillips Rodeo Run is a point-to-point 10K race and 5K fun run/walk that has been a Houston, Texas tradition since 1988. Runners and walkers lead the Houston Livestock Show and Rodeo (HLSR) Parade past thousands of spectators in downtown Houston. Race entry fees benefit the Houston Livestock Show and Rodeo Educational Fund. The ConocoPhillips Rodeo Run is held annually on the last Saturday in February in Houston, Texas.

Course Details

The 10K race and 5K fun run/walk courses are point-to-point and both finish at Minute Maid Park with a Texas-size post-race party complete with Texas hoopla, food, live music and family fun. The ConocoPhillips Rodeo Run 10K is sanctioned by USA Track & Field and the Gulf Association of USA Track & Field. 10K race participants are expected to adhere to USA Track & Field operating regulations. The 5K fun run/walk is unsanctioned and non-competitive. While the 5K route remains flat along the downtown streets, the 10K course features a one mile elevation of the route as it travels over the Elysian Viaduct north of downtown. The course features a view of the downtown skyline coming back over the viaduct shortly before the finish at Minute Maid Park.

ConocoPhillips Rodeo Run Race Results

Men's 10K Overall

Women's 10K Overall

Men's 10K Masters

Women's 10K Masters

Men's 10K Wheelchair

Women's 10K Wheelchair

bold notes course record

External links
 http://www.rodeohouston.com/Visit-the-Show/Pre-Show-Events/Rodeo-Run Official ConocoPhillips Rodeo Run Web site
 https://www.facebook.com/RodeoRun/ Official ConocoPhillips Rodeo Run Facebook Page

Videos
Houston Livestock Show and Rodeo – ConocoPhillips 2009 Sponsor Night

ConocoPhillips
Recurring events established in 1988
5K runs in the United States
10K runs in the United States
Sports in Houston
1988 establishments in Texas
Rodeo-affiliated events